"Life Ain't Always Beautiful" is a song written by Cyndi Goodman and Tommy Lee James, and recorded by American country music singer Gary Allan.  It was released in January 2006 as the second and final single from his album Tough All Over. The song became Allan's ninth Top 10 hit on the U.S. Billboard Hot Country Songs chart with a peak at number 4.

Content
The song is a ballad, in which the narrator talks about the realities of life, despite the peaks and valleys we go through. The narrator states that "Life isn't always beautiful / But it's a beautiful ride."

Critical reception
Matt Bjorke of Roughstock reviewed the song favorably, calling it "a poignant song sung softly and tenderly by an emotional vocalist."

Music video
The music video for this song features Gary singing the song in Las Vegas. It was directed by Paul Boyd.

Chart performance
The song debuted at number 58 on the Hot Country Songs chart dated January 21, 2006. It charted for 33 weeks on that chart, and reached a peak of number 4 on the chart dated August 19, 2006. In addition, it peaked at number 61 on the Billboard Hot 100.

Year-end charts

Certifications

References

External links

2006 singles
2005 songs
Country ballads
2000s ballads
Gary Allan songs
Songs written by Tommy Lee James
MCA Nashville Records singles
Songs written by Cyndi Thomson
Song recordings produced by Mark Wright (record producer)
Music videos directed by Paul Boyd

MCA Records singles